The Fairbury Public Library is a library in Fairbury, Nebraska.  Its building was constructed in 1908-09 as a Carnegie library with funding from the Carnegie Corporation. It was designed in the Classical Revival style by Tyler and Son, an architectural firm co-founded by English-born James Tyler and his son, James Tyler Jr.. The facade includes two sets of columns and a tympanum with "cherubs holding a ring which encircles a shield." The first 100 books were donated by the Fairbury Woman's Club. The building was listed on the National Register of Historic Places on September 12, 1985 as Fairbury Public-Carnegie Library.

In 2019, it continues to serve as the Fairbury Public Library.

References

External links
Fairbury Public Library, official website

National Register of Historic Places in Jefferson County, Nebraska
Neoclassical architecture in Nebraska
Library buildings completed in 1909
Carnegie libraries in Nebraska